The 2010–11 Euro Hockey Tour was the 15th playing of the Euro Hockey Tour. Four teams played in four tournaments, the Karjala Cup, Channel One Cup, LG Hockey Games, and Czech Hockey Games, for a total of 12 games.

Final standings

References
Season on hockeyarchives.info

 
2010–11 in European ice hockey
Euro Hockey Tour